Made In Dance is the first studio album by Lebanese electropop duo Slutterhouse. It was released in the Middle East on September 11, 2009.

Track listing
 "Illegal Thoughts"
 "You're So"
 "Inside The Station"
 "Flowers"
 "Drummer Girl"
 "Made In Dance"
 "Doe-Eyed"
 "French Robot Leuve"
 "Her Face"
 "Slutterhouse Blues" (Bonus Track)

References

External links
 Slutterhouse Official Website
 Slutterhouse MySpace Page

2009 debut albums
Slutterhouse albums